Sukunya Peangthem (born 5 September 1988) is a Thai footballer who plays as a forward. She has been a member of the Thailand women's national team.

International career
Peangthem represented Thailand at the 2007 AFC U-19 Women's Championship. She capped at senior level during two AFC Women's Asian Cup qualifications (2008 and 2010).

International goals
Scores and results list Thailand's goal tally first

References

1988 births
Living people
Sukunya Peangthem
Women's association football forwards
Sukunya Peangthem
Footballers at the 2006 Asian Games